Junta may refer to:

Government and military
 Junta (governing body) (from Spanish), the name of various historical and current governments and governing institutions, including civil ones
 Military junta, one form of junta, government led by a committee of military officers
 Junta (Habsburg), an administrative body that ruled in personal union with the Spanish Habsburgs
 Junta (Peninsular War), resistance governments in Spain during the Peninsular War
 Junta (Spanish American Independence),  resistance governments during the Spanish American wars of independence including the Cuban Junta
 ; see Cuban National Party
 Whig Junto, early 18th century political faction

Arts and entertainment
 Junta (album), a 1989 album by Phish
 Junta (game), a board game from West End Games
 Junta (comics), a fictional Marvel Comics character
 The Junta of the Philippines, an 1815 painting by Francisco Goya

People
 Junta Terashima, Japanese voice actor
 Thomas Junta, American hockey dad attacked and killed the referee in his son's pickup hockey game
 La Junta Indians, Indians living in La Junta de los Rios on the West Texas and Mexico border

Places

United States
 La Junta, Colorado
 La Junta Gardens, Colorado
 North La Junta, Colorado
 La Junta Municipal Airport
 Junta, West Virginia
 Pueblo de las Juntas, California

Other places
 Junta de Traslaloma, Spain
 Junta de Villalba de Losa, Spain
 Parque la Junta, Mexico
 Primera Junta (Buenos Aires Underground), Argentina

Other uses
 Junta (trade unionism), a group of New Model Unionists
Giunti (printers), Florentine family of printers, also spelled Junta

See also 
 Junto (disambiguation)